The Broxbourne Council election, 1986 was held to elect council members of the Broxbourne Borough Council, the local government authority of the borough of Broxbourne,  Hertfordshire, England.

Composition of expiring seats before election

Election results

Results summary 

An election was held in 14 wards on 8 May 1986.

The Conservative Party lost one seat to the Labour party in Rye Park Ward

The political balance of the council following this election was:

Conservative 32 seats
Labour 6 seats
SDP-Liberal Alliance 4 Seats

Ward results

References
Cheshunt & Waltham Telegraph Thursday 15 May 1986 Edition

1986
1986 English local elections
1980s in Hertfordshire